Adam Pilch (26 June 1965 in Wisła – 10 April 2010) was a Polish Lutheran clergy and military chaplain.

He died in the 2010 Polish Air Force Tu-154 crash near Smolensk on 10 April 2010. He is buried at the Evangelical Cemetery of the Augsburg Confession in Warsaw. He was posthumously awarded the Order of Polonia Restituta.

References

1965 births
2010 deaths
Polish Lutheran clergy
Polish military chaplains
Officers of the Order of Polonia Restituta
Burials at Evangelical-Augsburg Cemetery, Warsaw
Victims of the Smolensk air disaster
People from Wisła